Lake Yurkhyamyayarvi is a freshwater lake in Murmansk Oblast, Russia. The river Vuosnayoki flows from the lake.

Yurkhyamyayarvi
LYurkhyamyayarvi